The Character of Physical Law is a series of seven lectures by physicist Richard Feynman concerning the nature of the laws of physics. Feynman delivered the lectures in 1964 at Cornell University, as part of the Messenger Lectures series. The BBC recorded the lectures, and published a book under the same title the following year; Cornell published the BBC's recordings online in September 2015. In 2017 MIT Press published, with a new foreword by Frank Wilczek, a paperback reprint of the 1965 book.

Topics
The lectures covered the following topics:
 The law of gravitation, an example of physical law
 The relation of mathematics and physics
 The great conservation principles
 Symmetry in physical law
 The distinction of past and future
 Probability and uncertainty - the quantum mechanical view of nature
 Seeking new laws

Reception
Critical reception has been positive. The journal The Physics Teacher, in recommending it to both scientists and non-scientists alike, gave The Character of Physical Law a favorable review, writing that although the book was initially intended to supplement the recordings, it was "complete in itself and will appeal to a far wider audience".

Selections
"In general we look for a new law by the following process. First we guess it. ...", –

See also
 QED: The Strange Theory of Light and Matter
 The Feynman Lectures on Physics

References

Lectures
Works by Richard Feynman
Physics books
1965 non-fiction books
Books of lectures